IBM License Use Management (LUM) is the IBM product for technical software license management. IBM LUM for AIX is delivered as a standard component of AIX and is available on many other Unix flavors and on the Windows platform. CATIA is probably the most used software that uses this license manager.

See also
 Product activation
 Digital rights management
 Floating licensing
 List of license managers

External links
 IBM License Use Management (LUM)

System administration
Software licenses
LUM